Əyrik is a village in the Lachin District of Azerbaijan.

History
The village was located in the Armenian-occupied territories surrounding Nagorno-Karabakh, coming under the control of ethnic Armenian forces during the First Nagorno-Karabakh War in the early 1990s.

The village subsequently became part of the self-proclaimed Republic of Artsakh.

It was returned to Azerbaijan as part of the 2020 Nagorno-Karabakh ceasefire agreement.

References 

Populated places in Lachin District